Land of Lakes or the Land o' Lakes may refer to:

Associated with Minnesota
 a nickname for the U.S. state of Minnesota
 Land O'Lakes, a Minnesota-based national agricultural cooperative
 Land o' Lakes State Forest, a state forest in Minnesota

Elsewhere
Land o' Lakes, Florida, a census-designated area
Land o' Lakes High School in the U.S. state of Florida
Land o' Lakes, Wisconsin, a town
Land o' Lakes (community), Wisconsin, an unincorporated jurisdiction

See also
Lake District (disambiguation)
The Land of 10,000 Lakes